Donald Campbell Dewar (21 August 1937 – 11 October 2000) was a Scottish statesman and politician who served as the inaugural First Minister of Scotland and Leader of the Labour Party in Scotland from 1999 until his death in 2000. He previously served as Secretary of State for Scotland from 1997 to 1999. He was Member of Parliament (MP) for Glasgow Anniesland (formerly Glasgow Garscadden) from 1978 to 2000. Dewar was also Member of the Scottish Parliament (MSP) for the equivalent seat from 1999 to 2000.

Born in Glasgow, Dewar studied history, and later law, at the University of Glasgow. Before entering politics, he worked as a solicitor in Glasgow. At the age of 28, he was elected to the British House of Commons, representing Aberdeen South from 1966 to 1970. After losing his seat, he returned to law and hosted his own Friday evening talk show on Radio Clyde. Dewar was re-elected in the 1978 Glasgow Garscadden by-election and served as the MP until his death in 2000. Following Labour's landslide victory in 1997, he was appointed Secretary of State for Scotland by Prime Minister Tony Blair. As the Scottish secretary, he was an advocate of Scottish devolution, and campaigned for a Scottish Parliament in the 1997 Scottish devolution referendum. Following a successful campaign, Dewar worked on creating the Scotland Act 1998.

Dewar led the Labour campaign through the first Scottish Parliament election and was elected a Member of the Scottish Parliament (MSP) for Glasgow Anniesland. On 7 May 1999, he was appointed Leader of the Labour Party in Scotland and he led coalition talks with the Scottish Liberal Democrats. Following successful talks, the Labour-Liberal Democrat coalition was announced. Dewar was elected as first minister on 13 May 1999, by a vote of the parliament, and formed the first Scottish Executive cabinet.  As first minister, he set out the legislative programme for the Executive which included: an Education bill to improve standards in Scottish schools; land reform to give right of access to the countryside, a bill to abolish the feudal system of land tenure; and a bill to establish National Parks in Scotland.

On 10 October 2000, Dewar sustained a fall, and the following day he died of a brain hemorrhage at the age of 63 while still in office. Deputy First Minister Jim Wallace served as the acting first minister, until Henry McLeish was announced to succeed Dewar. Often regarded as the "Father of the Nation", Dewar is known for his work and commitment to the re-establishment of the Scottish Parliament and being the inaugural first minister of Scotland.

Early life

Early years and family 

Donald Campbell Dewar was born on 21 August 1937 in Glasgow. He grew up in a middle-class household in Kelvingrove as the only child of Dr. Alasdair Dewar, a consult dermatologist, and Mary Howat Dewar ( Bennett). Both of Dewar's parents had ill health during his childhood; his father contracted tuberculosis and his mother suffered from a benign brain tumour when he was young.

Dewar attended a small school in the Scottish Borders during the World War II. From the age of nine, he educated at Mosspark Primary School and then The Glasgow Academy. He made few friends at school and blamed his "shyness and gauche manner" on his experience as being an only child. A year before his death, Dewar admitted that he had been an "isolated misfit" in his youth, which is a reasoning for his public image of being awkward. He also claimed he was "remarkably socially inexperienced", having attended an only boys school as an only child with elderly parents.

Education 
In 1957, Dewar attended the University of Glasgow where his father, mother, two uncles and aunt also attended. He met several future politicians at the university Dialectic Society, including John Smith, who would later become leader of the Labour Party, Sir Menzies Campbell, who would later become leader of the Liberal Democrats, and Lord Irvine of Lairg, who would serve as Lord Chancellor. He met Alison McNair at Glasgow University, who he would later marry in 1964.

Dewar was an editor of the Glasgow University Guardian and sales manager for Glasgow University Magazine in 1960. He served as chairman of the University Labour Club from 1961 from 1962 and president of the Glasgow University Union. Dewar was an Honorary Secretary of the Students Representative Council. In 1962, he campaigned for Albert Luthuli, the banned African National Congress leader, as University Rector.

In 1961, Dewar gained a Master of Arts degree in History and in 1964 a second-class Bachelor of Law degree. After graduating, he worked as a solicitor in Glasgow.

Early political career

Member of Parliament
Dewar was a member of the Labour Party, and soon turned his sights towards being elected to parliament. In 1962, he was selected as the Labour candidate for the Aberdeen South constituency. In the 1964 general election, he failed to win the seat, but won it at the 1966 general election at the age of 28 defeating Priscilla Tweedsmuir by 1,799 votes.

In his maiden speech to the House of Commons on 4 May 1966, Dewar spoke against a proposed increase on potato tax. His speech became his first political success: as the tax was repealed the following year in 1967. Also that year, Dewar was made a Parliamentary Private Secretary to the President of the Board of Trade, Anthony Crosland.

Dewar remained in that position at the Department of Education until 1969, in which year he opposed a visit to Aberdeen by the Springbok rugby team and staged a silent vigil near the team's ground. In April 1968, he was proposed for a Minister of State position by Roy Jenkins, but was not appointed. Dewar lost his constituency seat to the Conservative candidate Iain Sproat at the 1970 general election by over 1,000 votes.

Out of parliament
Dewar spent much of the 1970s looking for another parliamentary seat. He hosted a Friday evening talk show on Radio Clyde, and in June 1971 was beaten by Dennis Canavan when he applied for the seat of West Stirlingshire. He worked as a solicitor for much of that decade and became a reporter on children's panels and was involved with the Lanarkshire local authority. Dewar became a partner in Ross Harper Murphy, in 1975.

Return to Westminster
Donald Dewar was selected for the seat Glasgow Garscadden by a majority of three, after Dewar's friend in the Amalgamated Union of Engineering Workers MP Willie Small died unexpectedly. He was returned to parliament at a by-election on 13 April 1978, a crucial victory which was seen as halting the rise of the Scottish National Party. In Scotland's first referendum on devolution, held in March 1979, he campaigned for a "Yes" vote alongside the Conservative Alick Buchanan-Smith and the Liberal Russell Johnston. Though they won a narrow majority, it fell short of the 40% required, contributing to the downfall of the Callaghan Government, in May 1979.

Opposition
Dewar gained a parliamentary platform as chairman of the Scottish Affairs Select Committee. After a year honing his inquisitorial skills, he joined the front bench in November 1980 as a Scottish affairs spokesman when Michael Foot became party leader. In 1981, as the Labour Party divided itself further due to internal disagreement, Dewar was almost deselected in his constituency by hard left activists, but he successfully defended himself against this threat.

He rose quickly through the ranks, becoming Shadow Scottish Secretary in November 1983. On 21 December 1988, Dewar was in Lockerbie after the bombing of Pan Am Flight 103, as the member of the Shadow Cabinet in charge of Scottish affairs. In 1992, John Smith made him Shadow Social security Secretary and three years later, Dewar was made a Chief Whip for the Labour Party by Tony Blair.

Secretary of State for Scotland; 1997–1999 
At the 1997 general election, he became MP for Glasgow Anniesland, which was mostly the same constituency with minor boundary changes. Labour won this election by a landslide, and Dewar was given the post of Secretary of State for Scotland. He was able to start the devolution process he dreamt of years earlier, and worked on creating the Scotland Act, popularly referred to as "Smith's unfinished business". When ratified, this was to give Scotland its first Parliament for nearly 300 years.

1999 Scottish Parliament election 
In January 1998, he confirmed that he would stand for a seat in the Scottish Parliament. The first elections to the Scottish Parliament were held on 6 May 1999, with Dewar leading the Scottish Labour Party against their main opponents, the Scottish National Party led by Alex Salmond. He was elected as the Member of the Scottish Parliament (MSP) for Glasgow Anniesland, having the unusual distinction of being both an MP and MSP for the same constituency.

First Minister of Scotland
On 13 May 1999, Dewar was elected by the Scottish Parliament for the nominee for First Minister of Scotland, after receiving 71 votes by MSPs. On 17 May, he received the Royal Warrant of Appointment by Her Majesty the Queen at Holyroodhouse and was officially sworn in at the Court of Session.

Entering government 
Although Scottish Labour won more seats than any other party, they did not have a majority in Parliament to allow them to form an Executive without the help of a smaller party. A deal was agreed with the Scottish Liberal Democrats to form a coalition, with Dewar agreeing to their demand for the abolition of up front tuition fees for university students.

On 13 May 1999, Dewar was nominated as first minister, and was officially appointed by the Queen on 17 May at a ceremony in the Palace of Holyroodhouse. He later travelled to the Court of Session to be sworn in by the lord president and receive the Great Seal of Scotland.

Legislation proposals 
 
On 16 June, Dewar set out the legislative programme for the Executive which included: an Education bill to improve standards in Scottish schools; land reform to give right of access to the countryside, a bill to abolish the feudal system of land tenure; and a bill to establish National Parks in Scotland.

Lobbygate scandal 
One of the first scandals to hit the new Scottish Parliament occurred when allegations that the lobbying arm of public relations company Beattie Media had privileged access to ministers were published, prompting Dewar to ask the standards committee to investigate the reports. The minister for finance, Jack McConnell, was called to appear before the standards committee during the investigation although he was later cleared of any wrongdoing and the committee declared there was no evidence he had been influenced from lobbying by Beattie Media.

Dewar also threatened to sack any minister or aide who briefed the media against another member of the Scottish Executive, following public rows between Jack McConnell and Health Minister Susan Deacon over the budget allocated to health .

2000 SQA examinations controversy 

The introduction in Scotland of the reformed examinations system in 2000 was criticised in the press and by the Government after a series of administrative and computer errors led to several thousand incorrect Higher and Intermediate certificates being sent out by post. The crisis took several months to resolve, and several management figures including the Chief Executive, Ron Tuck, resigned or lost their jobs as a result.

Death and funeral
In early 2000, Dewar was admitted to the Glasgow Royal Infirmary after tests at Stobhill Hospital highlighted "minor irregularity" in his heart. In May 2000, tests revealed he had a faulty aortic valve and he underwent a four hour heart operation to repair a leaking heart valve. His personal spokesperson, David Whitton, stated  "he is as concerned about his health as anyone else would be.". Although Dewar was not going under surgery, considerations over whether to cancel foreign trips to Japan were under close watch.

The following month, tests revealed Dewar had a faulty aortic valve. He underwent a four hour heart operation to repair a leaking heart valve. Kenneth Davidson, who performed the surgery, said Dewar was making a "particularly speedy" recovery and described the operation as a success.

Dewar was forced to take a three-month break and Deputy First Minister Jim Wallace took over as acting first minister. After returning to office, Dewar was described as being "visibly tired" and fears for his health at this stage were officially dismissed following a First Minister's Question Time.

Dewar dealt with the 2000 exam results controversy and the lorry drivers' strike, and attended the Labour Party conference in Brighton, but on 29 September 2000https://www.celticcountries.com/politics/34-scottish-first-ministers-address-at-the-trinity-college-29092000 he told the historian Tom Devine in Dublin that if he didn't feel any better, he would have to reappraise the situation in a few months time.

On 10 October 2000, Dewar sustained a seemingly harmless fall outside his official residence at Bute House following a meeting of the Scottish Cabinet. He seemed fine at first, but later that day suffered a massive brain haemorrhage which was possibly triggered by the anticoagulant medication he was taking following his heart surgery. At 7pm, five hours after his fall, Dewar was admitted to the Western General Hospital in Edinburgh after his condition rapidly deteriorated. By 9pm, he was put on a life-support machine in the hospital's intensive care unit. Dewar's condition worsened and he failed to regain consciousness. On 11 October at 12:18pm, Dewar was officially pronounced dead, aged 63.

Funeral 
Dewar's funeral service was held at Glasgow Cathedral, he was cremated on 18 October 2000 and his ashes were scattered at Lochgilphead in Argyll.

Guests

Royal family 

 The Prince of Wales, Duke of Rothesay

Heads of government 
 Tony Blair, Prime Minister of the United Kingdom, and Cherie Blair
 Jim Wallace, Acting First Minister of Scotland
 Bertie Ahern, Taoiseach (Irish Prime Minister)
 David Trimble, First Minister of Northern Ireland

Politicians 
 Members of the Scottish Executive Cabinet, including; 
 Wendy Alexander, Minister for Communities
 Henry McLeish, Minister for Enterprise and Lifelong Learning
 Members of the Cabinet of the United Kingdom, including;
 Gordon Brown, Chancellor of the Exchequer, and Sarah Brown 
 Jack Straw, Home Secretary 
 John Swinney, Leader of the Scottish National Party 
 Charles Kennedy, Leader of the Liberal Democrats
 Neil Kinnock, Former Leader of the Labour Party
 Menzies Campbell, Liberal Democrats Member of Parliament
 James Douglas-Hamilton, Conservative Member of Parliament

Other dignitaries 
 Ruth Wishart, Broadcaster and friend
 Lord Robertson, Secretary General of NATO
 Alastair Campbell, Downing Street Press Secretary
 Lord Hardie, Senator of the College of Justice
 John Monks, General Secretary of the Trades Union Congress (TUC)

Reactions and aftermath 
Dewar's death came as a shock to Scotland. UK Foreign Secretary described his death as "a tragedy for Donald and a tragedy for Scotland." Henry McLeish said: "this is a day of enormous sadness for Scotland and for me personally. Donald was devolution. The architect of the most successful constitutional change this century."

"Although he has become something of a political legend, Donald would have abhorred any attempt to turn him into some kind of secular saint. He would have been horrified at a Diana-style out-pouring of synthetic grief at his untimely death." — Iain Macwhirter, Sunday Herald, 15 October 2000.

Dewar was succeeded by Henry McLeish as First Minister.

Legacy 
Dewar's commitment for re-establishing the Scottish Parliament and his tireless work on writing the Scotland Act 1998 has led to him being referred to as the "Father of the Nation" and the "Father of devolution". His advocacy for Scottish devolution began in the 1960s, and at this stage, it was fairly unpopular among many Labour politicians, however, he ploughed ahead to gain support from all parties. Although Dewar did not associate with Scottish nationalism or support attempts for independence, he was a "great unionist" and saw the new Parliament as a "journey not a destination", which left many Labour supporters to question devolution. He introduced a proportional representation and many thought this, and devolution, would "end the Scottish National Party's success", but years on Labour's popularity plummeted and the SNP's popularity grew rapidly. Dewar received nicknames such as "Donald Dour" for his stiff matter of fact tone and "The Gannet" because of his huge appetite, could also be applied to his approach to politics.

In May 2002, then Prime Minister Tony Blair unveiled a statue of Dewar at the top of Glasgow's Buchanan Street, a street in Glasgow city centre. In keeping with his famous unkempt appearance, it showed Dewar wearing a slightly crushed jacket.

On the base of the statue were inscribed the opening words of the Scotland Act: "There Shall Be A Scottish Parliament", a phrase to which Dewar himself famously said, "I like that!"

Dewar called the Old Royal High School on Calton Hill in Edinburgh a "nationalist shibboleth", mainly because it had been the proposed site of the Scottish Assembly in the 1979 referendum. Dewar's opposition to the Calton Hill site partly contributed to the selection of the Holyrood site, which proved expensive.

The First ScotRail Class 334 train 334001 was named Donald Dewar in his memory. The "Dewar Arts Award" was created by the Scottish Executive in 2002 dedicated to his memory. This award supports talented young Scottish artists.

Personal life
On 20 July 1964, Dewar married Alison Mary McNair, with whom he had two children: a daughter, Marion, and a son, Ian. In 1972, McNair separated from Dewar and entered a relationship with the then Derry Irvine, a prominent Scottish barrister in London. Dewar and his wife divorced in 1973, and he never remarried. Dewar and Lord Irvine of Lairg never reconciled, even though they later served in the same Cabinet from May 1997 until 1999.

In September 2009, Dennis Canavan said Dewar reacted callously when Canavan's son was diagnosed with skin cancer in 1989. The disease eventually killed him. Canavan said Dewar remarked, "Oh no! That's all we need. He was mad enough before but I shudder to think what he'll be like now."

Dewar amassed a personal fortune in excess of £2,000,000 including public utility shares, antiques and artwork with a value of over £400,000.

References

Sources

External links

 
 
 

|-

|-

|-

|-

|-

|-

1937 births
2000 deaths
Alumni of the University of Glasgow
British Secretaries of State
First Ministers of Scotland
People educated at the Glasgow Academy
Scottish Labour MPs
Labour MSPs
Leaders of Scottish Labour
Members of the Privy Council of the United Kingdom
Members of the Scottish Parliament 1999–2003
Members of the Parliament of the United Kingdom for Aberdeen constituencies
Members of the Parliament of the United Kingdom for Glasgow constituencies
Members of the Scottish Parliament for Glasgow constituencies
National Union of Railwaymen-sponsored MPs
Scottish solicitors
UK MPs 1966–1970
UK MPs 1974–1979
UK MPs 1979–1983
UK MPs 1983–1987
UK MPs 1987–1992
UK MPs 1992–1997
UK MPs 1997–2001
20th-century Scottish lawyers
Scottish republicans